Neil Bartlett (15 September 1932 – 5 August 2008) was a chemist who specialized in fluorine and compounds containing fluorine, and became famous for creating the first noble gas compounds. He taught chemistry at the University of British Columbia and the University of California, Berkeley.

Biography
Neil Bartlett was born on 15 September 1932 in Newcastle-upon-Tyne, England. Bartlett's interest in chemistry dated back to an experiment at Heaton Grammar School when he was only eleven years old, in which he prepared "beautiful, well-formed" crystals by reaction of aqueous ammonia with copper sulfate. He explored chemistry by constructing a makeshift lab in his parents' home using chemicals and glassware he purchased from a local supply store.  He went on to attend King's College, University of Durham (which went on to become Newcastle University) in the United Kingdom where he obtained a Bachelor of Science (1954) and then a doctorate (1958).

In 1958, Bartlett's career began upon being appointed a lecturer in chemistry at the University of British Columbia in Vancouver, BC, Canada where he would ultimately reach the rank of full professor. During his time at the university he made his discovery that noble gases were indeed reactive enough to form bonds. He remained there until 1966, when he moved to Princeton University as a professor of chemistry and a member of the research staff at Bell Laboratories.  He then went on to join the chemistry department at the University of California, Berkeley in 1969 as a professor of chemistry until his retirement in 1993.  He was also a staff scientist at Lawrence Berkeley National Laboratory from 1969 to 1999. In 2000, he became a naturalized citizen of the United States. He died on 5 August 2008 of a ruptured aortic aneurysm. He lived with his wife Christina Bartlett until his death. They had four children.

Research
Bartlett's main specialty was the chemistry of fluorine and of compounds containing fluorine.  In 1962, Bartlett prepared the first noble gas compound, xenon hexafluoroplatinate, Xe+[PtF6]−. This contradicted established models of the nature of valency, as it was believed that all noble gases were entirely inert to chemical combination.  He subsequently produced and reproduced several other fluorides of xenon: XeF2, XeF4, and XeF6. By exploiting the solvent and basic properties of XeF6, he was able to prepare the first quinquevalent gold compound, Xe2F11+AuF6−.

Honors
In 1968 he was awarded the Elliott Cresson Medal.  In 1973, he was made a Fellow of the Royal Society (United Kingdom). In 1976 he received the Welch Award in Chemistry for his synthesis of chemical compounds of noble gases and the consequent opening of broad new fields of research in the inorganic chemistry.  He was elected a Fellow of the American Academy of Arts and Sciences in 1977. In 1979, he was honored as a Foreign Associate of the National Academy of Sciences. He was awarded the prestigious Davy Medal in 2002 for his discovery that the noble gases were not that noble after all. Previous recipients of the Davy Medal had included people as diverse as Robert Wilhelm Bunsen, the inventor of the Bunsen burner, and Albert Ladenburg, who suggested the existence of the compound prismane. In 2006, his research into the reactivity of noble gases was designated jointly by the American Chemical Society and the Canadian Society for Chemistry (CSC) as an International Historic Chemical Landmark at the University of British Columbia in recognition of its significance, "fundamental to the scientific understanding of the chemical bond." Bartlett was nominated for a Nobel Prize in Chemistry every year between 1963 and 1966  but did not get the Prize.

Hospitalization
In January 1963, Bartlett and his graduate student, P. R. Rao, were hospitalized after an explosion in the laboratory.  As they looked at what they thought might be the first crystals of XeF2, the compound exploded, getting shards of glass in the eyes of both men. According to Bartlett, he thought that the compound may have contained water molecules, and he and Rao took off their glasses to get a better look. They were both taken to the hospital for four weeks, and Bartlett was left with damaged vision in one eye. The last piece of glass from this accident was removed 27 years later.

References

Further reading

External links
 
 

1932 births
2008 deaths
Alumni of King's College, Newcastle
Deaths from aortic aneurysm
English chemists
Fellows of the American Academy of Arts and Sciences
Fellows of the Royal Society
Inorganic chemists
Members of the French Academy of Sciences
Foreign associates of the National Academy of Sciences
Princeton University faculty
Academic staff of the University of British Columbia Faculty of Science
UC Berkeley College of Chemistry faculty
Members of the Göttingen Academy of Sciences and Humanities